John Godfrey (born 1942) is a Canadian cabinet minister.

John Godfrey is also the name of:

John Godfrey (American football) (1921–2008), American football coach, head football coach at Whitter College (1960–1979)
John Godfrey (MP) for Tavistock in 1407
John Godfrey (composer), British composer and performer
John Godfrey (cricketer) (1917–1995), English cricketer
John Godfrey, bassist with Mungo Jerry, 1971–1972
John Henry Godfrey (1888–1970), head of British Department of Naval Intelligence during World War II and later head of the Royal Indian Navy
Captain John Godfrey, author of a fencing manual published in 1747
John Morrow Godfrey (1912–2001), Canadian pilot, lawyer and Senator
John T. Godfrey (1922–1958), American fighter pilot
John F. Godfrey (1839–1885), sailor, soldier and city attorney of Los Angeles, California
John Abram Godfrey (1833–1877), U.S. State Department Consul, politician and attorney
John Ray Godfrey, American basketball player
John Godfrey (diplomat), counterterrorism official and U.S. ambassador to Sudan